John Stewart Farquhar (8 April 1904 — 7 March 1984) was a Scottish first-class cricketer.

Farquhar was born in April 1904 at Cargill, Perthshire. He was educated at the Perth Academy. A club cricketer who played for both Perthshire and Forfarshire Cricket Club's, Farquhar made his debut for Scotland in first-class cricket against Ireland at Aberdeen in 1930. He played first-class cricket for Scotland until 1939, making six appearances; five of these came in the annual match against Ireland, with one coming against the touring Australians in 1934. Playing as a right-arm fast-medium bowler in the Scottish side, Farquhar took 22 wickets at an average of 19.18, with best figures of 4 for 13. Outside of cricket, Farquhar was a haulage contractor who was declared bankrupt in July 1935. He later died at Dundee in March 1984.

References

External links
 

1904 births
1984 deaths
People from Perthshire
People educated at Perth Academy
Scottish cricketers